Justin Cobbs (Serbian Cyrillic: Џастин Кобс; born March 16, 1991) is an American-born Montenegrin professional basketball player for Alvark Tokyo of the Japanese B.League. He played college basketball for the University of Minnesota then transferred after his freshman year to the Unversity of California. On February 17, 2014, Cobbs was named one of the finalists for the Bob Cousy Award, presented annually to the nation's top collegiate point guard. He is from Los Angeles, California, and attended Bishop Montgomery High School. He represents Montenegrо national team internationally.

Professional career
Cobbs went undrafted in the 2014 NBA draft.

On November 3, 2014 he signed his first professional contract with VEF Rīga of the VTB League. On December 1, 2014, he signed with Fraport Skyliners of the Basketball Bundesliga for the remainder of the season. With Skyliners he reached the EuroChallenge Final Four.

On July 12, 2015 he signed with İstanbul BB of the Turkish Basketball Super League. On December 27, 2015, he left İstanbul and signed with German club Bayern Munich for the remainder of the season.

On June 6, 2016, Cobbs signed with BCM Gravelines for the 2016–17 season.

On July 24, 2017, Cobbs signed with Le Mans Sarthe Basket for the 2017–18 season.

On July 31, 2018, he signed with Croatian basketball champion Cedevita.

On August 13, 2019, he signed with Budućnost VOLI of the ABA League. On May 15, 2020, Cobbs signed a two-year extension with the club.

He signed with Alvark Tokyo of the Japanese B.League on August 2, 2022.

National team career 
On February 21, 2020, Cobbs debuted for the Montenegrо national team in a win over the Great Britain.

Personal
He is a cousin of Los Angeles Lakers player Russell Westbrook.

References

External links
 Draftexpress.com Profile
 Euroleague Profile
 Eurobasket.com Profile
 FIBA.com Profile

1991 births
Living people
American men's basketball players
Montenegrin men's basketball players
American emigrants to Montenegro
ABA League players
African-American basketball players
American expatriate basketball people in Croatia
American expatriate basketball people in France
American expatriate basketball people in Germany
American expatriate basketball people in Latvia
American expatriate basketball people in Turkey
American expatriate basketball people in Montenegro
Basketball players from Los Angeles
BCM Gravelines players
BK VEF Rīga players
California Golden Bears men's basketball players
FC Bayern Munich basketball players
İstanbul Büyükşehir Belediyespor basketball players
KK Budućnost players
KK Cedevita players
Le Mans Sarthe Basket players
Montenegrin people of African-American descent
Naturalized citizens of Montenegro
Minnesota Golden Gophers men's basketball players
Point guards
Skyliners Frankfurt players
21st-century African-American sportspeople